The Esquimalt people are a group of the Coast Salish peoples living today in the area of Esquimalt, of which they are indirectly the namesake via the name of Esquimalt Harbour.  Their government is the Esquimalt First Nation.  They were signatories to the Douglas Treaties as the Kosapsum. x̣ʷiméɫǝɫ (Esquimalt) is the term which was originally used to describe the specific location of a group of Songhees people living near the mouth of the Mill Stream at the head of present day Esquimalt Harbour. x̣ʷiméɫǝɫ was translated by J.W. McKay during the negotiation of the Douglas treaties as meaning “a place of gradually shoaling” (Kennedy and Bouchard 1995:20). Over time, the term “Esquimalt” came to be applied more generally to the harbour area and to a group of people living at the village known as Kalla (Keddie 2003), located on the northern shore of Plumper Bay (archaeological site DcRu-36). The people of the present day Esquimalt Nation are descended from the signatories of the Kosapsum Treaty (Keddie 2003; Kennedy and Bouchard 1995), and not the group of people that the name originated from, who signed a separate treaty called the Whyomilth (Esquimalt) Treaty.

See also
 Esquimalt First Nation

External links
 Esquimalt First Nation
 The Esquimalt and Songhees Nations

References

Coast Salish
Southern Vancouver Island